Interstitial collagenase, also known as fibroblast collagenase, and  matrix metalloproteinase-1 (MMP-1) is an enzyme that in humans is encoded by the MMP1 gene.  The gene is part of a cluster of MMP genes which localize to chromosome 11q22.3.  MMP-1 was the first vertebrate collagenase both purified to homogeneity as a protein, and cloned as a cDNA. MMP-1 has an estimated molecular weight of 54 kDa.

Structure

MMP-1 has an archetypal structure consisting of a pre-domain, a pro-domain, a catalytic domain, a linker region and a hemopexin-like domain. The primary structure of MMP-1 was first published by Goldberg, G I, et al. Two main nomenclatures for the primary structure are currently in use, the original one from which the first amino-acid starts with the signalling peptide and a second one where the first amino-acid starts counting from the prodomain (proenzyme nomenclature).

Catalytic domain

The catalytic domains of MMPs share very similar characteristics, having a general shape of oblate ellipsoid with a diameter of ~40 Å. Despite the similarity of the catalytic domains of MMPs, this entry will focus only on the structural features of MMP-1 catalytic domain.

Overall structural characteristics

The catalytic domain of MMP-1 is composed of five highly twisted β-strands (sI-sV), three α-helix (hA-hC) and a total of eight loops, enclosing a total of five metal ions, three Ca2+ and two Zn2+, one of which with catalytic role.

The catalytic domain (CAT) of MMP-1 starts with the F100 (non-truncated CAT) as the first amino-acid of the N-terminal loop of the CAT domain. The first published x-ray structure of the CAT domain was representative of the truncated form of this domain, where the first 7 amino-acids are not present.

After the initial loop, the sequences follows to the first and longest β-sheet (sI). A second loop precedes large "amphipathic α-helix" (hA) that longitudinally spans protein site. The β-strands sII and sIII follows separated by the respective loops, loop 4 being commonly designated as "short loop" bridging sII to sIII. Following the sIII strand the sequence meets the 'S-shaped double loop' that is of primary importance for the peptide structure and catalytic activity (see further) as it extends to the cleft side "bulge", continuing to the only antiparallel β-strand sIV, which is prime importance for binding peptidic substrates or inhibitors by forming main chain hydrogen bond. Following sIV, loop Gln186-Gly192 and β-strand sV are responsible for contributing with many ligands to the several metal ions present in the protein (read further). A large open loop follows sV which has proven importance in substrate specificity within the MMPs family. A specific region (183)RWTNNFREY(191) has been identified as a critical segment of matrix metalloproteinase 1 for the expression of collagenolytic activity. On C-terminal part of the CAT Domain the hB α-helix, known as the "active-site helix" encompasses part of the "zinc-binding consensus sequence" HEXXHXXGXXH that is characteristic of the Metzincin superfamily. The α-helix hB finishes abruptly at Gly225 where the last loop of the domain starts. This last loop contains the "specificity loop" which is the shortest in the MMPs family. The Catalytic Domain ends at Gly261 with α-helix hC.

Function 

MMPs are involved in the breakdown of extracellular matrix in normal physiological processes, such as embryonic development, reproduction, and tissue remodeling, as well as in disease processes, such as arthritis and metastasis. Specifically, MMP-1 breaks down the interstitial collagens, types I, II, and III.

Regulation 

Mechanical force may increase the expression of MMP1 in human periodontal ligament cells.

Interactions 

MMP1 has been shown to interact with CD49b.

References

Further reading

External links 
 The MEROPS online database for peptidases and their inhibitors: M10.001
 

Matrix metalloproteinases
EC 3.4.24